Gerber Scientific Inc., headquartered in Tolland, Connecticut, USA, is the parent of companies that supply software and hardware systems for apparel and technical textiles, sign making and specialty graphics, composites and packaging applications. 

Gerber Scientific is owned by Vector Capital, a San Francisco-based, global private equity firm specializing in the technology sector that manages more than $2 billion of equity capital. On August 18, 2011, Gerber Scientific’s stockholders approved the take-private transaction of Gerber Scientific, Inc. by Vector Capital in a transaction valued at approximately $283 million. CITIC Capital Partners, a leading China based private equity firm, has a minority stake in Gerber Scientific alongside Vector.

Gerber Scientific, Inc. is divided into five businesses:

•	Gerber Technology, provides hardware and software systems to automate and manage the product design and manufacturing process with CAD software for pattern design, automated material spreading systems and computer-controlled cutting systems. 

•	Gerber Innovations, manufactures automated cutting hardware for the design, die making and short-run production segments of the packaging industry.

•	Virtek Vision International, serves aerospace carbon fiber composite part assembly, sheet metal part fabrication and construction markets with laser templating, quality inspection and spatial positioning systems.

•	Gerber’s Yunique Solutions, offers product lifecycle management software. This web-based system helps retailers, brand owners and manufacturers manage all of the details associated with their products from conception to store shelf and helps them communicate with their suppliers. 

•	Gerber Scientific Products (GSP) develops and manufactures computerized sign making and specialty graphics systems, software, materials, and accessories to provide sign shops and graphics professionals with solutions for vinyl-cutting, digital color printing and dimensional signage needs. GSP also develops and supplies aftermarket materials.

External links
 Official website
 Gerber Scale at The National Museum of American History 
 
 Gerber, H. Joseph (1953) The Gerber Variable Scale – An application and instruction manual, The Gerber Scientific Instrument Company, P.O. Box 305, Hartford, Connecticut, No. 400, 39 pp (pdf 7.3 MB)

Companies based in Tolland County, Connecticut
Tolland, Connecticut
1948 establishments in Connecticut
Textile_machinery_manufacturers